Westmoreland Mall is a two-level, enclosed super-regional shopping and casino complex in the municipality of Hempfield Township, Pennsylvania, southeast of Pittsburgh, and owned and operated by CBL Properties. It was completed in 1977 and was extensively renovated and expanded in 1993–1994. Retail anchor tenants include H&M, JCPenney, Macy's, Macy's Backstage, Macy's Home, Old Navy, and Live! Casino Pittsburgh, a 129,552 square foot gaming and entertainment complex in the mall's south wing.

Surrounding the mall are over 25 retailers and dining establishments, including the Westmoreland Crossing strip shopping center, which opened in 1978 and features a 15-screen AMC Theatres complex, Dick's Sporting Goods, Levin Furniture, Michaels Arts and Crafts, Planet Fitness and T.J. Maxx. A variety of restaurants and outparcels completes the mall complex.

It is located on the eastern side of the Greater Pittsburgh region on the heavily traveled U.S. Route 30 corridor. Adjacent to Westmoreland Mall, many big box retailers and restaurants can be found along the U.S. Route 30 and Donohoe Road retail area, which is the biggest concentration of retailers and other commercial businesses between Monroeville and Altoona.

History 
Prior to the development of Westmoreland Mall, the immediate area surrounding the site, known as Miller's Woods, was a mixture of open fields and wooded land. A handful of small businesses such as the former Winky's Restaurant (now Casual Male XL) were located on U.S. Route 30. At the time, residents shopped in Greensburg's business district, or at Greengate Mall (now Greengate Centre), west of the city. As the demand for more retail grew in the area, Kaufmann's and Sears approached the Rouse Company, owner of Greengate Mall, about the possibility of opening a new location at the facility. Rouse chose not to invest in the development to bring the stores in. Therefore, an idea for a new mall in the area was created.

Proposal 
In the mid-1970s, Adam Eidemiller, Inc., the development company that owned the land at the time, initially proposed building a motel on the open acreage, but eventually decided that it was not the best use of the property. The proliferation of shopping malls during the 1970s led Eidemiller to consider developing a regional mall on the site. It contacted St. Louis-based May Department Stores Company, parent of Pittsburgh-based retailer Kaufmann's about building a mall with the department store as an anchor but was rebuffed. Later, a joint venture between Eidemiller and the Goodman Company was formed, which already had experience with developing extensive projects, including Granite Run Mall near Philadelphia, Pennsylvania. Construction would begin in 1975, and Kaufmann's became the first store to open at the complex in late 1976.

Opening 
On February 28, 1977, the  Westmoreland Mall officially opened its doors with Kaufmann's and Sears as the anchor stores and 89 other retailers. Special events at the new mall included a visit by Mr. McFeely (played by David Newell) of Mister Rogers' Neighborhood. The mall's South Annex (now Westmoreland Crossing), originally anchored by Shop 'n Save, opened in 1978. At this time, the mall was owned and operated by The Kravco Company, now Simon Property Group. The rapid growth of Westmoreland Mall brought increasing pressure to smaller cross-town rival Greengate Mall, which was anchored by Horne's, JCPenney and Montgomery Ward. Greengate took proactive measures to remain competitive with Westmoreland Mall as it completed a makeover in 1981 and attempted to remerchandise and lease the center to new merchants well into the late 1980s.

Renovation and expansion 
By the early 1990s, significant retailer demand for additional space as well as increasing competition from Pittsburgh-area malls prompted the mall's owners to consider redeveloping the property. In response, it went through a $33 million renovation and expansion project, which began in 1993 and ended with the grand opening of JCPenney, which relocated from Greengate Mall, in 1994. The expansion also brought another  for 20 new retailers and a spacious food court, as well as a three-level parking garage and a new entrance. The last major mall addition took place in 1999, when Carmike Cinemas (now AMC Theatres) opened a new 15-screen stadium-style seating movie theater abutting the annex. The former 4-screen movie theater and a couple of adjacent shops at the mall were converted into Kaufmann's Home, which has since been renamed Macy's Home.

Live! Casino Pittsburgh 

Live! Casino Pittsburgh is a $150 million, 129,552 square foot gaming and entertainment complex at Westmoreland Mall, which was built in the former Bon-Ton building. It is owned by Gaming and Leisure Properties and operated by Baltimore-based Cordish Companies. 

On August 14, 2019, officials with the Pennsylvania Gaming Control Board awarded Cordish a gaming license to operate the two-story facility. Demolition began on the interior of the building in late 2019, with a groundbreaking ceremony held on November 13, 2019. Construction on the casino would be impacted due to the COVID-19 pandemic, although the project would be completed in just one year. The casino officially opened for business on November 24, 2020, following a soft opening the week prior.

The complex features a 31,677-square-foot casino floor with 750 slot machines and electronic table games and 33 live action table games on the lower level of the building, as well as a 1,582-square-foot poker room on the upper level with seven table games. In addition, the casino features a FanDuel sportsbook and lounge, a 7,000-square-foot event center called The Venue Live!, as well as several nationally recognized restaurants and live entertainment venues, including Sports & Social Steel City, Guy Fieri's American Kitchen and Bar and PBR Cowboy Bar Pittsburgh. The casino is accessible via exterior entrances as well as within the mall.

In March 2022, Cordish sold the building and ground lease to Gaming and Leisure Properties in a leaseback transaction, along with its sister property, Live! Casino & Hotel Philadelphia.

Anchor stores 
Currently, Westmoreland Mall features two major department stores including JCPenney and Macy's, who own their own buildings and operate at the mall under long-term ground leases. Three junior anchor stores also occupy the mall under long-term leases, including Swedish retailer H&M on the upper level near Center Court, Macy's Home on the lower level adjacent to Macy's, and Old Navy, located near Sears on the lower level. In addition, Live! Casino Pittsburgh serves as the mall's third anchor.

Sears, Roebuck and Co. originally operated a store along North Main Street in Downtown Greensburg. In the 1960s, Sears would relocate east of town to the site of what is now the Davis Center. A freestanding auto service center, now AAMCO Transmissions, was also built adjacent to the main store. At the time of the mall's development, the new Sears store would be twice as large as its predecessor, and offer a larger selection of merchandise on two levels. On December 28, 2018, it was announced that Sears would be closing as part of a plan to close 80 stores nationwide. The store closed on March 17, 2019.

JCPenney, like Sears, has also been in Greensburg since the early 1900s, originally located along South Main Street. It would replace its original store with a larger one at the former Greengate Mall, which operated from 1971 to 1994, when it relocated to Westmoreland Mall. In 2010, the JCPenney store was extensively renovated and a Sephora cosmetics shop opened on the store's upper level.

Troutman's, which had a few locations in the area, operated its flagship store in Downtown Greensburg since the early 1920s. However, it would also open a new location at Westmoreland Mall in 1979. Nonetheless, the downtown store would coexist with the mall location for a few years until its closure in 1985. Its sister store at Westmoreland was subsequently converted to Pomeroy's before being acquired by the parent company of The Bon-Ton in 1987. On April 18, 2018, it was announced that The Bon-Ton would close due to the company's liquidation. The store closed on July 29, 2018. On December 5, 2018, The Cordish Companies unveiled plans for the Live! Casino Pittsburgh gaming and entertainment complex in the former Bon-Ton building. The facility opened on November 24, 2020.

Pittsburgh-based retailer Kaufmann's never had a presence in Westmoreland County until the mall's opening in 1977. On September 9, 2006, Federated Department Stores converted all former May Company regional department store nameplates, including Kaufmann's, into Macy's as part of a nationwide rebranding program.

Anchor store square footage

Westmoreland Mall

Westmoreland Crossing

References

External links 
 Westmoreland Mall official website

Shopping malls in Metro Pittsburgh
Buildings and structures in Westmoreland County, Pennsylvania
CBL Properties
Tourist attractions in Westmoreland County, Pennsylvania
Shopping malls established in 1977